Elections to Belfast City Council were held on 21 May 1997 on the same day as the other Northern Irish local government elections. The election used nine district electoral areas to elect a total of 51 councillors, most representing the more heavily populated north and west.

Unionists lost overall control of Belfast City Council for the first time in its history, with Alliance holding the balance of power between unionists and nationalists. Alban Maginness from the SDLP became the first nationalist Lord Mayor.

Election results

Note: "Votes" are the first preference votes.

Districts summary

|- class="unsortable" align="centre"
!rowspan=2 align="left"|Ward
! % 
!Cllrs
! %
!Cllrs
! %
!Cllrs
! %
!Cllrs
! %
!Cllrs
! %
!Cllrs
! %
!Cllrs
! %
!Cllrs
!rowspan=2|TotalCllrs
|- class="unsortable" align="center"
!colspan=2 bgcolor="" | Sinn Féin
!colspan=2 bgcolor="" | UUP
!colspan=2 bgcolor=""| SDLP
!colspan=2 bgcolor="" | DUP
!colspan=2 bgcolor="" | Alliance
!colspan=2 bgcolor="" | PUP
!colspan=2 bgcolor="" | UDP
!colspan=2 bgcolor="white"| Others
|-
|align="left"|Balmoral
|0.0
|0
|bgcolor="40BFF5"|31.5
|bgcolor="40BFF5"|2
|26.1
|2
|13.9
|1
|17.0
|1
|3.5
|0
|4.6
|0
|3.4
|0
|6
|-
|align="left"|Castle
|11.4
|1
|bgcolor="40BFF5"|27.0
|bgcolor="40BFF5"|2
|20.9
|1
|24.6
|1
|11.9
|1
|0.0
|0
|1.8
|0
|2.4
|0
|6
|-
|align="left"|Court
|0.0
|0
|27.8
|2
|0.0
|0
|19.0
|1
|1.5
|0
|bgcolor="#2B45A2"|32.8
|bgcolor="#2B45A2"|1
|12.9
|1
|6.0
|0
|5
|-
|align="left"|Laganbank
|15.1
|1
|25.1
|2
|bgcolor="#99FF66"|27.4
|bgcolor="#99FF66"|2
|5.1
|0
|12.2
|1
|7.0
|0
|0.0
|0
|8.1
|0
|5
|-
|align="left"|Lower Falls
|bgcolor="#008800"|79.7
|bgcolor="#008800"|4
|0.0
|0
|16.2
|1
|0.0
|0
|0.4
|0
|0.0
|0
|0.0
|0
|3.7
|0
|5
|-
|align="left"|Oldpark
|bgcolor="#008800"|44.8
|bgcolor="#008800"|3
|16.3
|1
|16.3
|1
|4.7
|0
|1.2
|0
|11.2
|1
|3.0
|0
|2.5
|0
|6
|-
|align="left"|Pottinger
|8.6
|0
|bgcolor="40BFF5"|29.3
|bgcolor="40BFF5"|2
|2.7
|0
|26.5
|2
|7.7
|1
|20.9
|1
|1.5
|0
|2.8
|0
|6
|-
|align="left"|Upper Falls
|bgcolor="#008800"|68.1
|bgcolor="#008800"|4
|0.0
|0
|29.1
|1
|1.4
|0
|0.6
|0
|0.0
|0
|0.0
|0
|0.8
|0
|5
|-
|align="left"|Victoria
|0.0
|0
|bgcolor="40BFF5"|31.7
|bgcolor="40BFF5"|2
|0.0
|0
|31.0
|2
|31.2
|2
|0.0
|0
|0.0
|0
|5.9
|0
|7
|- class="unsortable" class="sortbottom" style="background:#C9C9C9"
|align="left"| Total
|27.6
|13
|20.1
|13
|15.6
|7
|12.1
|7
|9.2
|6
|9.2
|3
|2.4
|1
|3.8
|0
|51
|-
|}

District results

Balmoral

1993: 2 x UUP, 2 x DUP, 1 x SDLP, 1 x Alliance
1997: 2 x UUP, 2 x SDLP, 1 x Alliance, 1 x DUP
1993-1997 Change: SDLP gain from DUP

Castle

1993: 2 x UUP, 2 SDLP, 1 x DUP, 1 x Independent Unionist 
1997: 2 x UUP, 1 x DUP, 1 x SDLP, 1 x Alliance, 1 x Sinn Féin 
1993-1997 Change: Alliance and Sinn Féin gain from UUP and SDLP, Independent Unionist joins UUP

Court

1993: 2 x UUP, 1 x DUP, 1 x PUP, 1 x Independent Unionist
1997: 2 x UUP, 1 x PUP, 1 x DUP, 1 x UDP
1993-1997 Change: UDP gain from Independent Unionist

Laganbank

1993: 2 x UUP, 2 x SDLP, 1 x Alliance 
1997: 2 x UUP, 1 x SDLP, 1 x Sinn Féin, 1 x Alliance 
1993-1997 Change: Sinn Féin gain from SDLP

Lower Falls

1993: 4 x Sinn Féin, 1 x SDLP
1997: 4 x Sinn Féin, 1 x SDLP
1993-1997 Change: No change

Oldpark

1993: 3 x Sinn Féin, 2 x UUP, 1 x SDLP
1997: 3 x Sinn Féin, 1 x SDLP, 1 x UUP, 1 x PUP
1993-1997 Change: PUP gain from UUP

Pottinger

1993: 3 x DUP, 2 x UUP, 1 x Alliance
1997: 2 x DUP, 2 x UUP, 1 x PUP, 1 x Sinn Féin
1993-1997 Change: PUP gain from DUP

Upper Falls

1993: 3 x Sinn Féin, 2 x SDLP
1997: 4 x Sinn Féin, 1 x SDLP
1993-1997 Change: Sinn Féin gain from SDLP

Victoria

1993: 3 x UUP, 2 x Alliance, 2 x DUP
1997: 2 x UUP, 2 x Alliance, 2 x DUP, 1 x Independent Unionist
1993-1997 Change: Independent Unionist gain from UUP

References

Belfast City Council elections
Belfast